Winton Woods High School is a public high school located in Forest Park, just north of Cincinnati, Ohio, United States. It is the only high school in the Winton Woods City School District.  Winton Woods High School serves about 1,560 students from Village of Greenhills, the City of Forest Park, and parts of Springfield Township.

History
Winton Woods High School opened during the 1991–92 academic year, after the merging of the district's two former high schools, Greenhills High School and Forest Park High School.  Winton Woods High School meets in the building that used to house Forest Park High School.

Academy of Global Studies
In August 2011, the Academy of Global Studies (AGS) at Winton Woods High School opened its doors to students in Grade 9. AGS is part of the Winton Woods City School District and partners with the New Tech Network and the International Studies Schools Network.

Students in AGS study a standards-based curriculum that prepares them to meet the requirements of the new Ohio Core Standards in English, Mathematics, Science, and Social Studies. Students are required to study four years of Spanish or Mandarin Chinese. Global themes are integrated in an interdisciplinary fashion through a Project-Based Learning (PBL) environment. Students also take a yearly Global Seminar course, as well as complete a Senior Capstone requirement and fulfill service hours.  AGS also features a "Model UN" program where students compete with other US high schools.  Ninth grade students have the opportunity to experience the "Heifer Ranch" as part of a field trip to Little Rock, Arkansas.

The AGS class of 2015 was the first graduating class from this program.

Extracurricular activities
 Art Club
 Drama Club/Stage Crew
 Gospel Keys
 Key Club
 No Boundaries
 Step Team, True Colors (GSA Organization), Warriors for the Christ
 Yearbook Club, Mock-Trial, Model United Nations, Robotics, Student Council, National Honor Society, Student Voice Committee
 Sustainability Club
 Student Government

Performing arts

Winton Woods High School is known locally for its performing arts program.
 Choral Program The Winton Woods Choral Program has an enrollment of over 450 students in grades 4–12. The curricular program consists of the Elementary School Select Chorus, 2 Intermediate School choirs, 2 Middle School choirs and four high school choirs.  Curricular courses are also offered in 7–12 general music and music appreciation as well as music theory. The 4–12 choral program also offers a wide variety of extra-curricular offerings, including the WWMS "24", WWHS Gospel Keys, and two vocal a cappella ensembles, "Evolution" and "Encore." Both the middle and high schools present a musical theater production each spring. The award-winning high school ensembles have qualified for state OMEA competition for the last 37 years and have been recognized by the United States House of Representatives as well as the Ohio State Senate and House of Representatives. They have recorded two CDs with the Cincinnati Pops Orchestra, one of which was a top 15 on the "Billboard" charts. In 2008 they were one of five choirs from the USA selected to perform in a pre-Olympic Festival in Beijing and Shanghai, China.
 Band and Orchestra The Winton Woods Band Program consists of nearly 375 students in grades 5–12. Band begins in the fifth grade where students learn the fundamentals of playing an instrument. In sixth grade, students begin playing more challenging, full ensemble music. Both Fifth and Sixth Grade Bands meet during the school day and perform a minimum of two concerts during the school year. The Middle School Concert Bands are split by grade level and perform a minimum of three concerts a year. An extra-curricular Middle School Jazz Band rehearses after school and performs throughout the district and the community. The High School Band Program begins the year with one Marching Band which meets during the school day and serves as a community pride group, performing at football games, parades, and civic performances. Following marching season, two Concert Bands meet during the school day and perform several concerts a year. Jazz Band, Basketball Pep Band, and Pit Orchestra are extra-curricular offerings at the high school. All Concert Bands grades 7–12 perform for the Ohio Music Education Association Adjudicated Events. Students have the opportunity to perform at Solo & Ensemble and audition for District and State Honor Bands, as well as outside performing ensembles.

Athletics
 Fall sports: Cheerleading, cross country, football, golf, soccer, tennis (girls), volleyball
 Winter sports: Basketball, bowling, swimming, wrestling
 Spring sports: Baseball, softball, tennis (boys), track, lacrosse

Ohio High School Athletic Association state championships

 Boys' football – 2009, 2021 
 Girls' basketball* – 1984
 Boys' track and field* – 1988, 1989
 Boys' baseball** – 1956
 Boys' cross country** – 1986
 * Titles won by Forest Park High School prior to merger.
 ** Titles won by Greenhills High School prior to merger.

Notable alumni

 Rayshawn Askew, former football player
 Maalik Bomar, football player
 Kwan Cheatham (born 1995), basketball player for Ironi Nes Ziona of the Israel Basketball Premier League
 Semaj Christon, basketball player
 Mike Edwards, football player
 Tony George, former football player
 Robert Hite, basketball player
 David Long Jr., football player
 Brandon Miree, former football player
 Luke Spencer, soccer coach and former player
 Miyan Williams, football player

References

External links
 School Website

High schools in Hamilton County, Ohio
Public high schools in Ohio
Educational institutions established in 1991
1991 establishments in Ohio